The 127th Combined Arms Brigade is the primary maneuver element of the 82nd Group Army in the Central Theater Command of the Chinese People's Liberation Army and is its sole infantry division as of present.

The 127th Combined Arms Brigade is one of the most famous and best-equipped PLA formations. Its three main regiments, the 371st, 379th, and 380th, are all Red Army Infantry Regiments. The 379th regiment is the famed Ye Ting independent regiment, a nationalist armored train unit that was once commanded by Dr Sun Yat-Sen, with Zhou Enlai as its political commissar during the 1911 Xinhai Revolution. The "Iron Army" title was an honor for its Armored Train roots. The 379th is also the regiment who formed the basis of the forces that fought KMT allies in the victory in the 1935 Battle of Luding Bridge.

See also
Republic of China Marine Corps, where the 77th Marine Brigade and the 99th Marine Brigade also claims legacy to the NRA Fourth Army with the nicknames "Iron Vanguard" and "Iron Army/Iron Force" respectively.

References

External links
 http://www.globalsecurity.org/military/world/china/127mid.htm

Infantry divisions of the People's Volunteer Army
127
Red Army Divisions of the People's Liberation Army